Errol Wilson (born 18 November 1959) is a Jamaican cricketer. He played in eleven first-class and five List A matches for the Jamaican cricket team from 1982 to 1991.

See also
 List of Jamaican representative cricketers

References

External links
 

1959 births
Living people
Jamaican cricketers
Jamaica cricketers
People from Saint Elizabeth Parish